Flat Baroque and Berserk is the fourth album by English folk / rock singer-songwriter and guitarist Roy Harper, and was first released in 1970 by Harvest Records.

History
Flat Baroque and Berserk was the first of Harper's recordings to enter the charts, reaching number 20 in the UK album chart in January 1970. Produced by Peter Jenner and recorded at Abbey Road Studios, Flat Baroque and Berserk was the first of eight albums recorded for EMI's Harvest label. Harper has said of the album, "for the first time in my recording career, proper care and attention was paid to the presentation of the song."

The album contains some of Harper's best-known songs. "I Hate the White Man", in particular, is noted for its uncompromising lyrics, and Allmusic described the song as 

Harper described the song as 
The album also features "Another Day", a song of regret for lost love. The lyrics are written from the point of view of a man looking back with regret upon a missed chance that might have led him to a love he has searched for. The song was covered as a duet by Kate Bush and Peter Gabriel in her 1979 television special, and later by This Mortal Coil on their 1984 album It'll End in Tears. The cover by Bush led to collaboration with Harper in 1980; he singing backing vocals on her song "Breathing" and she duetting on the track "You" on Harper's album The Unknown Soldier.

"How Does it Feel" is used in the closing scene of episode 3 of the third season of The Handmaid's Tale.

A studio conversation with Tony Visconti is heard before "Tom Tiddler's Ground", on which he plays recorder.

The album closes with one of Harper's most rock-based tracks, "Hell's Angels", on which backing is provided by progressive rock band The Nice and features the unusual combination of acoustic guitar played through a wah-wah pedal.

Two of the album's tracks "I Hate the White Man" ("Den hvite mann") and "Don't You Grieve" ("Kjære ikke gråt") were later covered by Norwegian singer Finn Kalvik whom Harper had met and performed with in Oslo in 1970. Following the murder of George Floyd by police officer Derek Chauvin in May 2020, Harper wrote a blog post breaking down the inspiration for "I Hate the White Man" and why he believes the song remains revenant.

Tracks on compilation albums

One of the album tracks, "Song of the Ages" appeared on the 1970 Harvest Records sampler album, Picnic – A Breath of Fresh Air. However, the inclusion of the previously unreleased Pink Floyd song, "Embryo", considered unfinished by the band and used without their permission, saw the album's withdrawal from sale.

A similarly entitled retrospective compilation album, A Breath of Fresh Air – A Harvest Records Anthology 1969–1974, was released in 2007. This three-disc compilation contained only three tracks in common with its precursor. Harper's "Song of the Ages" was dropped in favour of "Francesca" and "Don't You Grieve", and two other Harper tracks were also included; "South Africa" from his 1973 release Lifemask and "Twelve Hours Of Sunset" from his following 1974 album Valentine.

Track listing
All tracks written by Roy Harper, though upon the original 1970 release, all tracks except "I Hate the White Man", "Francesca" and "Hell's Angels" were credited to H. Ash, an alias of Harper.

Personnel
Roy Harper – vocals, acoustic guitar, electric guitar on "Hell's Angels"
 David Bedford – arrangements
 Skaila Kanga – harp on "Song of the Ages"
 Tony Visconti – recorder on "Tom Tiddler's Ground"
 Keith Emerson – keyboards on "Hell's Angels"
 Lee Jackson – bass guitar on "Hell's Angels"
 Brian Davison – drums on "Hell's Angels"

Technical
Phil McDonald, Neil Richmond – sound engineer
Lon Goddard – cover design
John McKenzie – photography

References

Roy Harper (singer) albums
1970 albums
Chrysalis Records albums
Harvest Records albums
Science Friction albums
Albums produced by Peter Jenner